The St. Nikola Abbey is a former monastery of the Augustinian canons and today's mother house of the German Oratory Sisters in Passau, Lower Bavaria, Germany.

History
St. Nikola was donated by Altmann, Bishop of Passau, the former Kapellan of the Empress Agnes, around 1070 (30 September 1067 according to the Founding Letter; 3 March 1072 according to the privilege of Pope Alexander II). Soon after the foundation, the monastery became engulfed in the turmoil of investiture, and the canons of the monastery were expelled. In 1111, the penitent appears to be re-established, which is confirmed by a certificate of the possession of Emperor Henry V. By the passage of the Vogteirechte from the Formbacher-Viegernern to the Ortenburger, which were displaced by the dukes of Bavaria, the Passau bishops lost the pin 1248 to the Bavarian dukes. Thus, in contrast to the Princely Passau, the monastic complex was situated in the area of Bavaria.

The monastic life gave rise to criticism in the fifteenth century, as in a visitation by Nicholas Cusanus. In the 16th century, St. Nikola was captured by the Reformation. The prophet Thomas Gunner stepped over to the teaching of Luther, but had to flee to Austria in 1556. It was only in the course of further years that the counter-revolution could take root, as confirmed by the papal Nuncio Ninguarda in 1581, during his visitation. Since the prophet Claudius Aichel (1666–1683) the abbots of the monastery were given the right to bear the miter.

Several parishes were also incorporated into the monastery, namely Bavaria, Aidenbach, Alburg, Hartkirchen, Pocking and Mittich, and also in Austria Alkofen, Grieskirchen, Münichreith, Neukirchen, Wimsbach, Roitham at the Traunfall and Pollham. After the dissolution of the monastery, these became independent parishes, which were mostly cared for by the choir-makers of St. Nikola. The monastery of Sankt Oswald was briefly (1431–1563) supervised by St. Nikola, but then passed to the Benedictines. The last of the Exchorherren, Isidor Alois Reisinger, died on 8 May 1851 in Kirchdorf. The four Freihöfe of the monastery in the Habsburg countries were withdrawn by the Lower Austrian state property administration and later sold. The most important was probably the Nikolaihof in Mautern an der Donau; the former Turmhof in Horn now serves as a town hall, and also the Klosterneuburgger Hof in Klosterneuburg and the Freyhof in Aschach on the Danube.

In the Baroque period, the monastery building had offered a home and workshop to several generations of sculptors. Among them, Joseph Matthias Götz, and Joseph Deutschmann, for the time being the most important workshop of the sculpture system was located between Munich and Vienna.

References

Augustinian monasteries in Germany